= Lexean =

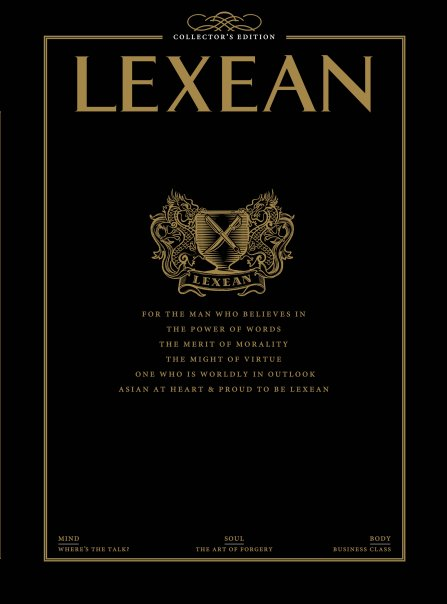
January 2007 – Issue 01

Lexean was a news analysis and lifestyle publication, based in Singapore. The bi-monthly magazine rolled out its first issue as an exclusive limited edition in January 2007. The magazine ceased publication in 2009.

The magazine did not use people, objects or scenery on its cover. Instead the cover featured an illustration based on the theme of the issue. The publishers, Singapore-based Viscion Media Group, also coined the term Lexean.

The company also created a fake coat of arms to represent its readers – the Lexean. The coat of arms along with a description was featured as the cover of its first issue, printed in royal gold on black.

== Who is a Lexean? ==
Lexean is seen as a derivative of the word 'lexicon'. The origin and mainstream use of the term Lexean was made popular by the magazine in its first issue. The term soon caught on with readers as further issues stressed and magnified the qualities of a Lexean and his way of life.

== Content ==
The magazine had three sections – Mind, Soul and Body

The Mind section was an analysis of current issues in Politics, Business, Society, Religion, Technology and the Media. The Soul section discussed the high-flying lifestyles of the Lexean with reviews and recommendations on fine dining, alcohol, travel and health. The Body section tracked and gave readers tips on the latest in men's fashion.

== Circulation ==
The Audit Bureau of Circulations Singapore (ABC) confirmed the 100,000 circulation figure of Lexean magazine in 2007 as a "special one issue audit for a specific purpose required by the media owner and their advertisers". This was followed by a report of less than convincing reactions from certain media owners in the country.

In July 2007, ABC Singapore defended its audit of Lexean and issued a statement saying any media owner who implies the Lexean audit is simply about being able to print a large number of any magazine and claim that as an audited circulation as "misleading, mischievous and intended to cast doubts on the integrity of the circulation audit process of ABC Singapore".

In Oct 2008, it was reported that Viscion Media Group, publisher of Lexean and Playeur magazines, has been sued by freelancers and a top modelling agency for allegedly not paying wages and bills. A former freelance writer claimed she was owed $800 for two articles, while a freelance photographer has lodged a suit seeking $3,000. The company, which published its first magazine Lexean in late 2006, also recently settled a $25,000 lawsuit by Upfront Models, which claimed that Viscion had defaulted on payments for use of its models. On top of these legal battles, at least four employees from Viscion have lodged complaints to the Singapore Ministry of Manpower.
